The Tapatapa River (El Limon) is a river of Venezuela. It drains into Lake Valencia.

See also
List of rivers of Venezuela

References
Rand McNally, The New International Atlas, 1993.

Rivers of Venezuela